Lucky Larkin is a 1930 American pre-Code Western film directed by Harry Joe Brown and written by Marion Jackson and Leslie Mason. The film stars Ken Maynard, Nora Lane, Jim Farley, Harry Todd, Paul Hurst and Charles Clary. The film was released on March 2, 1930, by Universal Pictures.

Cast 
Ken Maynard as 'Lucky' Larkin
Tarzan as Larkin's Horse
Nora Lane as Emmy Lou Parkinson
Jim Farley as Martin Brierson 
Harry Todd as Bill Parkinson
Paul Hurst as Pete Brierson
Charles Clary as Colonel Lee
Blue Washington as Hambone

References

External links 
 

1930 films
1930s English-language films
American Western (genre) films
1930 Western (genre) films
Universal Pictures films
Films directed by Harry Joe Brown
American black-and-white films
1930s American films